Jake Browning (born April 11, 1996) is an American football quarterback for the Cincinnati Bengals of the National Football League (NFL). He played college football for the Washington Huskies and signed with the Minnesota Vikings as an undrafted free agent in 2019.

Early years
Browning attended Folsom High School in Folsom, California. At Folsom, Browning had a 4.0 GPA, was active in clubs, and set numerous national and state records during his high school career. In 46 games, he completed 1,191 of 1,708 attempts for 16,775 yards and 229 touchdowns, all California records. The 229 touchdowns also broke the national record previously held by Maty Mauk who had 219. As a senior, he threw for a national-record 91 touchdown passes. He also passed for a California record of 5,790 yards, which broke his record from his junior year. Browning was the Gatorade Football Player of the Year during his junior and senior years.

Browning was rated as a four-star recruit by Rivals.com and was ranked as the third-best pro-style recruit in his class. He committed to the University of Washington to play college football. Browning studied at the university's Foster School of Business, as a direct admit into their Business Administration program his freshman year.

College career

Freshman
In his first year at Washington, Browning became the second ever (in any game) true freshman to start at the quarterback position at UW (the other was Marques Tuiasosopo vs. Oregon in 1997) and the first true freshman to start a season opener for the Huskies. In his first career start, he completed 20 of 34 passes for 150 yards and one interception.

Sophomore
In his sophomore year, Browning performed on a much higher level, guiding UW to a 12–2 record, and the Huskies' first conference championship since 2000. He set a new record for touchdowns per attempt at 12.2%. On November 29, he was named Pac-12 Offensive Player of the Year and first-team all-Pac-12. Browning came in sixth in the 2016 Heisman Trophy voting, narrowly missing an invitation to attend the award ceremony in New York City. His sixth-place finish is the second-best Heisman voting finish in school history, behind only Steve Emtman who finished fourth.

Browning underwent shoulder surgery on his throwing arm a couple of weeks after facing Alabama in the College Football Playoff. His injury was kept secret for nearly two months, and some commentators have speculated as to a connection between the injury and Browning's reduced performance in the later portion of the season.

Junior
Browning started all 13 games of the 2017 season at quarterback, was named to the Academic All-Pac-12 second-team, was an honorable mention All-Pac-12, and broke the UW career touchdown passes record this year. Browning completed 230 of his attempted 336 throws, which was his highest throwing percentage. He threw for 19 touchdowns and had only 5 interceptions throughout the season. He threw for 2,719 yards as well.

College statistics

Professional career

Minnesota Vikings
On April 29, 2019, Browning signed with the Minnesota Vikings as an undrafted free agent. He was waived on August 31, 2019 and was signed to the practice squad the next day. He signed a reserve/future contract with the Vikings on January 12, 2020.

Browning was waived by the Vikings during final roster cuts on September 5, 2020, but was re-signed to the Vikings practice squad the next day. He signed a reserve/future contract with the Vikings on January 4, 2021.

On August 31, 2021, Browning was waived by the Vikings.

Cincinnati Bengals
On September 7, 2021, Browning was signed to the Cincinnati Bengals practice squad.

On February 15, 2022, Browning signed a reserve/future contract. He was waived on August 30, 2022 and signed to the practice squad the next day. He signed a reserve/future contract on January 31, 2023.

See also
 Washington Huskies football statistical leaders

References

External links
Washington Huskies bio

1996 births
Living people
American football quarterbacks
Cincinnati Bengals players
Minnesota Vikings players
People from Folsom, California
Players of American football from California
Sportspeople from Sacramento County, California
Washington Huskies football players